Takanawa Peninsula is a peninsula in Ehime Prefecture that juts out into the Seto Inland Sea.

References 

Peninsulas of Japan
Landforms of Ehime Prefecture